Caledon Lake is a lake in Caledon, Peel Region, Ontario, Canada. Caledon Lake is within the Greater Toronto Area Greenbelt.

References

Lakes of the Regional Municipality of Peel